Coleomethia crinicornis is a species of beetle in the family Cerambycidae. It was described by Hovore in 1987.

References

Methiini
Beetles described in 1987